Muhlenberg is a surname, and may refer to:

 Edward D. Muhlenberg (1831–1883), American civil engineer and Civil War officer
 Francis Swaine Muhlenberg (1795–1831, American political leader
 Frederick Muhlenberg (1750–1801), first Speaker of the United States House of Representatives
 Frederick Augustus Muhlenberg (1887–1980), founder of Muhlenberg Greene Architects and an American military and political leader
 Frederick Augustus Muhlenberg (educator) (1818–1901), president of Muhlenberg College
 Gotthilf Heinrich Ernst Muhlenberg (1753–1815), American clergyman and botanist
 Henry Muhlenberg (1711–1787), German Lutheran clergyman and patriarch of the Muhlenberg family
 Henry A. P. Muhlenberg (1782–1844), early American political leader and diplomat
 Henry Augustus Muhlenberg (1823–1854), American politician
 Henry Augustus Muhlenberg (1848–1906) of Reading, Pennsylvania 
 Henry Muhlenberg (mayor), of Lancaster, Pennsylvania
 Peter Muhlenberg (1746–1807), clergyman and major general of the Continental Army
 William Augustus Muhlenberg (1796–1877), American philanthropist and Protestant Episcopal clergyman